Noala may refer to:

 Lake Noala, a lake in the Upemba Depression
 Noala language
 Noala people, Australia

See also
 Noale, a town in Venice, Veneto, Italy